3x3 Pro Basketball League (also known as 3BL India) is men's and women's professional 3x3 basketball leagues in India recognized by the FIBA and also by Basketball Federation of India. Founded in 2017, the competition currently consists of 13 teams in men's and 6 teams in women's league.

3x3 is a form of basketball played three-a-side on a half court, with one basket. The game lasts for 10 minutes with sudden death at 21 points. The winner is the first team to score 21 or the team with the highest score at the end of the 10 minutes. 3x3 is FIBA’s second official discipline and will be played in Tokyo 2021 at the Olympics and the Commonwealth Games 2022 in Birmingham.

3BL is managed by YKBK Enterprise Private Limited, a company registered and headquartered in Gurugram, Haryana. YKBK is the exclusive right holder of operating a Professional 3x3 Basketball League in the Indian Sub-continent by FIBA, which includes six countries (India, Sri Lanka, Bangladesh, Nepal, Maldives and Bhutan). 3BL was founded by Rohit Bakshi and Yoshiya Kato,
The first season of the league was played in Bengaluru, Delhi, Aizawl, Kolkata, Chennai and Mumbai.

Teams 
There are currently 18 teams with international and Indian players, both men and women.

Seasons

Season 2

See also 
 UBA Pro Basketball League
 Elite Pro Basketball League
 INBL
 National Basketball Championship
 Sports in India

References

External links 
Official website

2017 establishments in India
Basketball competitions in India
Basketball teams in India
Professional sports leagues in India
Sports leagues established in 2017